The Lithuanian Tennis Union (Lietuvos Teniso Sąjunga) is the national governing body for the sport of tennis in Lithuania. LTS was created to standardize rules and regulations and to promote and develop the growth of tennis in Lithuania.

The LTS includes 173 players including world number 77 Ričardas Berankis and has 47 coaches.

The current president is Ramūnas Grušas.

External links
Lithuanian Tennis Association

Lithuania
Tennis in Lithuania
Tennis